Kristen Simmons (born June 5, 1984) is an author of young adult fiction. Her first published novel was Article 5, a dystopian novel about an America controlled by the "Moral Militia." Article 5 has been followed by two sequels: Breaking Point and Three. She has worked with survivors of abuse and trauma as a mental health therapist, taught Jazzercise in five states, and is forever in search of the next best cupcake. Currently she lives in Cincinnati, Ohio with her husband, where she spends her days supporting the caffeine industry and chasing her delightfully rambunctious son.

Bibliography

Article 5
 Article 5 (2012)
 Breaking Point (2013)
 Three (2014)

Vale Hall
 The Deceivers, (2019)
 Scammed, (2020)
 Payback, (2021)

Set Fire to the Gods (with Sara Raasch)
 Set Fire to the Gods (2020)
 Rise Up from the Embers (2021)

Other books
 The Glass Arrow, (2015)
 Metaltown, (2017)
 "Burned Away" (short story set in Metaltown) (2016)
 Pacifica (2018)
 Find Him Where You Left Him Dead (2023)

References

American writers of young adult literature
Living people
Year of birth missing (living people)
Place of birth missing (living people)
21st-century American women writers
Women writers of young adult literature
American women novelists
21st-century American novelists